The Veiled Virgin is a Carrara marble statue carved in Rome by Italian sculptor Giovanni Strazza  (1818–1875), depicting the bust of a veiled Virgin Mary.  The exact date of the statue's completion is unknown, but it was probably in the early 1850s.

The veil gives the appearance of being translucent, but in fact is carved of marble. The technique is similar to Giuseppe Sanmartino's 1753 statue Veiled Christ in the Cappella Sansevero in Naples.

The statue was transported to Newfoundland in 1856, as recorded on December 4 in the diary of Bishop John Thomas Mullock: "Received safely from Rome, a beautiful statue of the Blessed Virgin Mary in marble, by Strazza. The face is veiled, and the figure and features are all seen. It is a perfect gem of art".

The Veiled Virgin was then kept at the Episcopal Palace next to the Roman Catholic Cathedral in St. John's until 1862, when Bishop Mullock presented it to Mother Mary Magdalene O'Shaughnessy, the Superior of Presentation Convent.  The bust has since remained under the care of Presentation Sisters, in Cathedral Square, St. John's.

In the context of the Risorgimento, the Veiled Virgin was intended to symbolize Italy.  

Marble busts of veiled women were a popular theme among Strazza's contemporaries, the most important of whom were Pietro Rossi and Raffaelle Monti.

See also
 Vestal Virgin Tuccia, 1743 sculpture
 Modesty, 1752 sculpture
 Veiled Christ, 1753 sculpture
 Veiled Vestal 1847 sculpture
 The Veiled Nun, c. 1863 sculpture
 Veiled Rebecca, 1863 sculpture

References

 The Veiled Virgin, Newfoundland and Labrador Heritage

Culture of St. John's, Newfoundland and Labrador
Statues of the Virgin Mary
Busts in Canada
Veiled statues